Lamancha railway station served the hamlet of Lamancha, Peeblesshire, Scotland, from 1864 to 1933 on the Leadburn, Linton and Dolphinton Railway.

History 
The station opened on 4 July 1864 by the Leadburn, Linton and Dolphinton Railway. Opposite was a goods siding with another serving a loading bank and to the south was the station building. The station closed on 1 April 1933.

References

External links 

Disused railway stations in the Scottish Borders
Railway stations in Great Britain opened in 1864
Railway stations in Great Britain closed in 1933
1864 establishments in Scotland
1933 disestablishments in Scotland